Bürs is a municipality in the district of Bludenz in the Austrian state of Vorarlberg.

Climate

Population

References

Cities and towns in Bludenz District